BWQ or bwq may refer to:

BWQ, the IATA code for Brewarrina Airport, New South Wales, Australia
BWQ, the station code for Bhalwal railway station, Pakistan
BWQ, the acronym for buzzword quotient
bwq, the ISO 639-3 code for the Bobo language in southern Burkina Faso, Mali